Valley View Mall may refer to the following shopping facilities:
 Valley View Mall (Roanoke, Virginia) in Roanoke, Virginia
 Valley View Mall (La Crosse, Wisconsin) in La Crosse, Wisconsin
 Valley View Center at Dallas Midtown in Dallas, Texas